Solute carrier family 22 member 18 is a protein that in humans is encoded by the SLC22A18 gene.

Function 

This gene is one of several tumor-suppressing subtransferable fragments located in the imprinted gene domain of 11p15.5, an important tumor-suppressor gene region. Alterations in this region have been associated with the Beckwith-Wiedemann syndrome, Wilms tumor, rhabdomyosarcoma, adrenocortical carcinoma, and lung, ovarian, and breast cancer. This gene may play a role in malignancies and disease that involve this region as well as the transport of chloroquine- and quinidine-related compounds in the kidney. Two alternative transcripts encoding the same isoform have been described.

See also 
 Solute carrier family

References

Further reading 

 
 
 
 
 
 
 
 

Solute carrier family